Terese Svoboda is an American poet, novelist, memoirist, short story writer, librettist, translator, biographer, critic and videomaker.

Early life and education
Svoboda was raised in Nebraska. She attended local schools, then matriculated at Manhattanville College, the University of Nebraska, Montreal Museum of Fine Arts, Oxford University, Stanford University, the University of Colorado, and the University of British Columbia, where she graduated with a B.F.A. in studio art and creative writing. Columbia University awarded her an M.F.A.

Career
Svoboda is the author of eight collections of poetry, seven novels, two collections of short fiction,  a memoir, a biography and a book of translation. The opera Wet, for which she wrote the libretto, premiered at RedCat at L.A. Disney Hall in 2005. Her fourteen works in video have won numerous awards and are distributed worldwide. In writing about her work, reviewers have noted her frequent use of humor to address dire subjects, her interest in fabulism, and her lyrical use of language, especially as a poet writing prose. An ardent unconventional feminist, she often writes about women in the Midwest in a way that has been termed “exotic, sophisticated, and heartbreaking.” Her travels for the Smithsonian's Anthropology Film Archive to the South Pacific and the South Sudan provide additional settings. Postwar Japan is the location for her memoir about executions of U.S. servicemen by U.S. authorities. Her work has appeared in Granta, the New Yorker, the Atlantic, Poetry, New York Times, Slate, Paris Review. Her best work has been praised. The New York Post described her memoir, Black Glasses Like Clark Kent as "astounding"; The Washington Post regarded her biography Anything That Burns You as "magisterial". Theatrix: Play Poems is forthcoming from Anhinga Press in 2021.

Teaching
Svoboda has held visiting teaching appointments at Sarah Lawrence College, The New School, Bennington College, the University of Miami, the University of Tampa, Fordham, Fairleigh Dickinson, Wichita State, Williams College, San Francisco State College, the College of William and Mary, Stonybook/Southampton College, and Columbia University's School of the Arts. Twice she has been the distinguished visiting professor at the University of Hawaii, and once the McGee Professor at Davidson College. She has also taught for the Summer Literary Seminars Program in St. Petersburg, Russia and Tiblsi, Georgia, the Kwani? LitFest in Kenya, and for the State Department and the University of Iowa's International Writing Program in Kenya. She has lectured at the Norman Mailer's Writers Colony, U. of Wellington (Victoria) Masters program in New Zealand, and as the Pabst Endowed Chair at Atlantic Center for the Arts.

South Sudan
After translating the songs of the Nuer people of the South Sudan on a PEN/Columbia Fellowship, she founded a scholarship for Nuer high school students in Nebraska. She was consulting producer for "The Quilted Conscience," a PBS documentary on South Sudanese girls learning to quilt with Nebraskan women.

Selected awards
She has won a Guggenheim and the Bobst Prize for fiction, the Iowa Prize for poetry, an NEH and a PEN/Columbia grant for translation, the Graywolf Nonfiction Prize, a Jerome Foundation prize for video, the O. Henry award for the short story, two Appleman awards, and a Pushcart Prize for the essay. She is also a three-time winner of the New York Foundation for the Arts fellowship, and has been awarded Headlands, James Merrill, Hawthornden, Bogliasco, Yaddo, MacDowell, Hermitage and Bellagio residencies. Her opera WET premiered at L.A.'s Disney Hall in 2005.
2013 Guggenheim Fellowship in fiction 
2013 Money for Women  Barbara Deming Memorial Fund 
2008 Best of Japan 2008 in the Japan Times for Black Glasses Like Clark Kent
2007 Graywolf Nonfiction Prize
2005 Appleman Foundation for WET libretto
2003 Pushcart Prize for an essay
1998, 1993 New York Foundation for the Arts fellowship
1998 Walter E. Dakin Fellow in fiction, Sewanee Writing Conference
1994 Bobst Prize and the Great Lakes Colleges Association New Writers Award 
1992 Margaret Sanger: A Public Nuisance, co-director/writer of an ITVS-produced video selected by The Getty as one of the best two experimental biographies of the decade 
1990 Iowa Poetry Prize 
1990 Appleman Foundation grant for video
1990 New York State Council for the Arts grant for video
1988 Jerome Foundation Fellow
1985 Emily Dickinson Award, Poetry Society of America
1987 Cecil Hemley Award, Poetry Society of America
1983 Creative Artist Public Service fellow
1978 National Endowment for the Humanities grant in translation
1974 PEN/Columbia Translation Fellow
1973 Hannah del Vecchio Award in Playwriting

Video
The highlights of Svoboda's video work include exhibition in Exchange and Evolution as part of the Getty's Pacific Standard Time exhibition at RedCat, Ars Electronica, PBS, MoMA, WNYC, L.A.C.E., Lifestyle TV, Berlin Videofest, Art Institute of Chicago, CalArts, AFI, Long Beach Museum of Art, New American Makers, Athens Film Festival, Ohio Film Festival, American Film Festival, Atlanta Film Festival (Director's Choice), L.A. Freewaves, Pacific Film Archives, Columbus Film Festival, and Worldwide Video Festival. She also co-curated "Between Word and Image" for the Museum of Modern Art and Poets House, an exhibition that traveled to Banff and the Northwest Film Center.

Personal life
Svoboda is married to the high-tech inventor Stephen Medaris Bull, and she is the mother of three children.

Bibliography

Poetry 
Collections
All Aberration  /  / e
Laughing Africa Iowa Prize in Poetry,  /  / e
Mere Mortals  / 
Treason  / 
Weapons Grade  / 
Dogs Are Not Cats (chapbook) 
When the Next Big War Blows Down the Valley: Selected and New Poems  / 
Professor Harriman's Steam Air-Ship 
Theatrix: Poetry Plays 

List of poems

Novels 
Cannibal (novel) Bobst Prize and the Great Lakes Colleges Association First Fiction Prize, 
A Drink Called Paradise (novel)  /  
Tin God (novel) John Gardner Fiction book Award Finalist, 
Pirate Talk or Mermalade (novel) 
Bohemian Girl (novel) Booklist Ten Best Westerns 2012,

Short fiction 
Collections
Trailer Girl and Other Stories  / 
Great American Desert (stories)

Non-fiction 
Biography
Anything That Burns You: A Portrait of Lola Ridge, Radical Poet 
Memoirs
Black Glasses Like Clark Kent Graywolf Press Nonfiction Price, Publisher : Graywolf Press; Illustrated edition (Jan. 22 2008)  / 
Translations
Cleaned the Crocodile's Teeth (Nuer)

References

 “Removing the sepia-tint: an Interview with Terese Svoboda,” Prick of the Spindle. 
 “Like Prions: An Interview with Terese Svoboda by Shya Scanlon” 
 “Terese Svoboda”

External links 
 Author's Website
 Terese Svoboda on Fictionaut
 Caned

Year of birth missing (living people)
Living people
20th-century American novelists
20th-century American poets
20th-century American women writers
21st-century American novelists
21st-century American poets
21st-century American women writers
American women novelists
American women poets
English-language poets
Manhattanville College alumni
The New Yorker people
Poets from Nebraska
American people of Czech descent